The 2018 Roscommon Senior Football Championship is the 118th edition of Roscommon GAA's premier Gaelic football tournament for senior graded clubs in County Roscommon, Ireland. The tournament consists of 12 teams, with the winner representing Roscommon in the Connacht Senior Club Football Championship.

The championship starts with a seeded group stage and then progresses to a knock out stage.

St. Brigid's were the defending champions for the second season running after they defeated Roscommon Gaels in the previous years final.

Michael Glavey's (as Connacht I.C.F.C. champions and All-Ireland I.C.F.C. runners-up bounced straight back to the top flight for this season from the Intermediate ranks after relegation in 2016, through claiming the 2017 I.F.C. title.

Team Changes

The following teams have changed division since the 2017 championship season.

To S.F.C.
Promoted from 2017 Roscommon I.F.C.
 Michael Glavey's -  (Intermediate Champions)

From S.F.C.
Relegated to 2018 Roscommon I.F.C.
 Kilmore

Group stage
All 12 teams enter the competition at this stage.

The competition split into two groups, based on their performance in the 2017 Group stages. Group 1 consists of teams who reached the quarter-finals last year or better. Group 2 consists of two bottom placed finishers in Group 1 last year as well as 3rd and 4th placed in Group 2 last year, the 2017 Relegation Playoff winners and the 2016 Intermediate champions.

The top 2 teams in Group 1 go into the semi-finals, where they await the winners of the quarter-finals, which are composed of the 3rd and 4th placed teams in Group 1 along with the top 2 finishers in Group 2. The bottom 2 teams in Group 2 will enter a Relegation Playoff.

Group 1

Round 1

Round 2

Round 3

Round 4

Round 5

Group 2

Round 1

Round 2

Round 3

Round 4

Round 5

Knock-Out Stages

Relegation Final

Finals

Quarter-finals

Semi-finals

Final

Connacht Senior Club Football Championship

References

Roscommon Senior Football Championship
Roscommon Senior Football Championship
Roscommon SFC